The Alabama A&M Bulldogs baseball team is the varsity intercollegiate baseball program of Alabama A&M University in Huntsville, Alabama, United States. The program's first season is unknown, and it has been a member of the NCAA Division I Southwestern Athletic Conference since the start of the 1999 season. Its home venue is Bulldog Field, located on Alabama A&M's campus. Elliot Jones is the team's head coach starting in the 2021 season. The program has appeared in 0 NCAA Tournaments. It has won zero conference tournament championships and 0 regular season conference titles. As of the start of the 2018 Major League Baseball season, 1 former Bulldogs have appeared in Major League Baseball.

History

Conference affiliations
 Southern Intercollegiate Athletic Conference (1947–1998)
 Southwestern Athletic Conference (1999–present)

Bulldog Field
The venue has a capacity of 500 spectators. The field opened in 1997. It also features dugouts, batting cages, and grandstand seating.

Head coaches
Alabama A&M's longest tenured head coach was Thomas Wesley, who has coached the team from 1991 to 2006.

Notable former players
Below is a list of notable former Bulldogs and the seasons in which they played for Alabama A&M.

Cleon Jones (1968)

See also
 List of NCAA Division I baseball programs

References

External links